Gregory (Gary) Koshnitsky   (6 October 1907, Kishinev – 17 September 1999, Australia) was an Australian chess master.

Born in Kishinev, in the Bessarabia Governorate of the Russian Empire (now Moldova), he emigrated in his youth to Australia.

He was Australian Champion in 1933 and 1939 (with Lajos Steiner), and won three Queensland titles, seven New South Wales titles, and one South Australian title (1966). His last win was something of an anniversary, as he won his first tournament in Australia, the Queensland championship in 1926. He captained the Australian Olympic Chess teams in 1964, 1968, 1972 and 1980.

Koshnitsky was awarded the IMC title (International Master of Correspondence Chess) in 1972. He was appointed Honorary Member of FIDE in 1993.

He was the author of the book Chess Made Easy (with Cecil Purdy).

He was the father-in-law of Ngan Phan-Koshnitsky.

References

External links 
 Gary Koshnitsky at 365Chess.com

1907 births
1999 deaths
Chess players from Chișinău
People from Kishinyovsky Uyezd
Moldovan Jews
Emigrants from the Russian Empire to Australia
Australian people of Moldovan-Jewish descent
Australian chess players
Australian chess writers
20th-century chess players